The 2018 Liuzhou International Challenger was a professional tennis tournament played on hard courts. It was the first edition of the tournament for men and third edition for women. It was the part of the 2018 ATP Challenger Tour and 2018 ITF Women's Circuit. It took place in Liuzhou, China between 22 and 28 October 2018.

Men's singles main draw entrants

Seeds

 1 Rankings are as of October 15, 2018.

Other entrants
The following players received wildcards into the singles main draw:
  Sun Fajing
  Te Rigele
  Wu Di
  Wu Yibing

The following players received entry from the qualifying draw:
  Chung Yun-seong
  Alejandro Davidovich Fokina
  Sumit Nagal
  Renta Tokuda

Women's singles main draw entrants

Seeds

 1 Rankings are as of October 22, 2018.

Other entrants
The following players received wildcards into the singles main draw:
  Ren Jiaqi
  Wang Yafan
  Wei Sijia
  Zheng Qinwen

The following players received entry from the qualifying draw:
  Choi Ji-hee
  Sarah-Rebecca Sekulic
  Ye Qiuyu
  Zhang Kailin

Champions

Men's singles

  Radu Albot def.  Miomir Kecmanović, 6–2, 4–6, 6–3.

Women's singles

  Wang Yafan def.  Han Na-lae, 6–4, 6–2

Men's doubles

  Gong Maoxin /  Zhang Ze def.  Hsieh Cheng-peng /  Christopher Rungkat, 6–3, 2–6, [10–3].

Women's doubles

  Eudice Chong /  Ye Qiuyu def.  Kang Jiaqi /  Lee So-ra, 7–5, 6–3

External links 
 2018 Liuzhou International Challenger at ITFtennis.com

Liuzhou International Challenger
Liuzhou International Challenger
2018 in Chinese tennis
Liuzhou Open